Naayudamma is a 2006 Telugu action-drama film directed by Madhava Sai. It stars Vijayashanti, Rekha and Prabhu Deva in the lead roles. Naayudamma had been in the making for several years, before opening to mixed reviews in August 2006.

Cast
Vijayashanti as Naayudamma and Jhansi
 Prabhu Deva
Rekha
Sayaji Shinde
Mansoor Ali Khan
Narasimharaju
Shivadwaj
Delhi Ganesh
Riyaz Khan
M. S. Narayana

Production
The production of Nayudamma was initially planned in three languages; Kannada, Tamil and Telugu, but the delayed nature of the production meant that the idea was shelved. The delay of the film meant that Vijayashanti had already opted to quit films and pursue a political career, by the end of shoot in 2004. The film was stuck in production for several years, before having a delayed release in August 2006.

Soundtrack

Release
Soon after the release of the film, the team held a success meet in Hyderabad to acknowledge the public's support and promote the film. Vijayashanti's political affiliations meant that posters of the film were burnt after she campaigned solely for the development of Telangana.

References

2006 films
2000s Telugu-language films
Films scored by Deva (composer)